Beginnings is a compilation album by Meredith Monk, released on November 24, 2009 through Tzadik Records.

Track listing

Personnel 
Musicians
Andrea Goodman – vocals (11)
Lanny Harrison – percussion (5)
Susan Kampe – vocals (11)
Meredith Monk – vocals (1-6, 8-17), piano (7-10, 16), organ (6, 12-15), guitar (1, 2), bass guitar (4), Jew's harp (5), production
Don Preston – drums (4), organ (4), recording (4)
Monica Solem – vocals (11)
Collin Walcott – percussion (5)
Production
David Behrman – recording (17)
Heung-Heung Chin – design
Scott Hull – mastering (5)
Jack Mitchell – photography
Peter Pilafian – recording (5)
Robert Withers – recording (2)
Daniel Zellman – recording (1, 3)

References 

2009 compilation albums
Tzadik Records compilation albums
Meredith Monk albums